Grodno TV Tower, also known as the Hrodna TV Tower, is a 254 metre tall lattice tower at Grodno, Belarus, built in 1984 of a unique design. The upper section of the tower is guyed using four horizontal crossbars fixed on the main body of the tower extending out from it about two-thirds of the way up the tower. Only three other towers are known to have been built of a similar design all within a three year period. They are the Wavre Transmitter, the Astara TV Tower and the Vitebsk TV Tower, the Grodno TV Tower is the tallest of the four. The Wavre Transmitter is the only one of which was built outside of the Soviet Union.

Grodno TV Tower is used for FM and TV broadcasting.

A nearly identical but a few metres lower tower is at Vitebsk.

Transmitted programmes

See also 
Lattice tower

References

External links
 https://web.archive.org/web/20060626104532/http://dxsignal.info/read/ant_grodno.htm
 http://www.skyscraperpage.com/diagrams/?b59516
 

Lattice towers
Towers in Belarus
Towers completed in 1984